The Bankstown railway line is a railway line serving the Canterbury-Bankstown and Inner West regions of Sydney between the stations of Sydenham and Lidcombe.

History

The line opened on 1 February 1895, branching from the Illawarra line from Sydenham to Belmore.  The line was originally constructed as an alternative route for goods traffic on the main southern railway, with planners intending the line to eventually link up with the main line at Liverpool.  The 1890s depression put this plan on hold; by the time funds became available again, it had been decided to make the Bankstown line a suburban-only line to service the growing population west of Canterbury.

On 14 April 1909, the line was extended to Bankstown, with intermediate stations at Lakemba and Punchbowl. In 1916, the Metropolitan Goods Line was constructed, running parallel to Bankstown line from Marrickville to Campsie. On 16 July 1928, it was extended to Regents Park where it joined the Main South line via a triangular junction.

In 1926, the line between Sydenham and Bankstown became the second line in Sydney to be electrified which also saw Punchbowl Maintenance Depot built. Electrification was extended from Bankstown to Regents Park in 1939. A new station between Lakemba and Punchbowl at Wiley Park opened on 19 June 1938. Punchbowl Maintenance Depot closed in 1994.

In January 2006 a four-year project to upgrade the line was completed. The work included the re-sleepering of the entire line, replacing the former wooden sleepers with the more durable concrete ones, replacement and upgrade of the signalling, and also replacement of the ageing catenary, mostly with the more modern double contact wire variety. The lengthy upgrade process was noted for its "January Closedowns", in which the entire line was closed in January for the bulk of the upgrade work to take place.

Services
Electric passenger services operated along the Bankstown Line to Wynyard station until the 1956 opening of Circular Quay station and the completion of the City Circle. In 1979 with the opening of the Eastern Suburbs line the direction around the City Circle reversed with trips from Bankstown going to St James first and vice versa.

All services operated as a loop, continuing from Lidcombe to the City via the Main Suburban line, until the early 2000s. At this point, this was changed with alternate services routed to terminate at Liverpool.

A new timetable released in October 2013 broke the loop between the two lines. As part of the Rail Clearways Program, new turnbacks were constructed at Lidcombe and Homebush to allow the separation of both lines and increase their reliability and frequency. Services were also changed to operate mostly around the City Circle via Town Hall on weekdays (rather than via Museum).

The line was depicted in a brown colour in the early 1990s before being changed to a purple colour around 2000, before it became the current orange colour.

The line has had various stopping patterns since its introduction. Most services stopped at all stations, alternating between the two branches. Until late 2017, there were no express services except during peak hours. Most express services ran all stops between Liverpool and Campsie, then stopping Sydenham, Redfern, Central, continuing into the City Circle. In 2013, Marrickville and St Peters were added to this express pattern. As part of the More Trains More Services program, in November 2017, extra services on the Bankstown line were added. The express pattern was changed to all stops between Liverpool and Birrong, then Bankstown, Lakemba, Campsie, Marrickville, Sydenham, Redfern then City Circle. This pattern operates on weekdays at all times except for inbound trains during the morning peak. Inbound trains during the morning peak have 5 different stopping patterns, all of which skip at least one stop. Each pattern runs every 30 minutes, for a total of 10 trains per hour.

Trains can terminate at Sydenham (crossover), Bankstown (loop road without platform), Lidcombe (dock platform), Villawood (two crossovers) and Liverpool (loop road with platform). Campsie also has three crossovers, but have not yet been connected to the signalling system. Trains only terminate at Sydenham and Villawood during service interruptions or trackwork. Bankstown is also rarely used to terminate, other than for some late night services and during trackwork.

Sydney Metro
As part of the Sydney Metro project, the line from Sydenham to Bankstown will be converted by 2024 from its current double deck commuter rail configuration to a rapid transit line. Using Alstom Metropolis rolling stock, the line is expected to see higher frequency service with fewer seats per train.  Consultants have identified the curved steam train-era station platforms on the line as a challenge in its conversion, as straighter platforms are required for the operation of driver-less, high-frequency metro services.

References

 
Canterbury, New South Wales
Standard gauge railways in Australia
Bankstown, New South Wales